Benjamin Alfred Washam (March 17, 1915 – March 28, 1984) was an American animator who is best known for working under director Chuck Jones for nearly 30 years.  According to his World War II draft registration, he was born in Newport, Jackson County, Arkansas.

Career 
Washam worked at Warner Bros. Cartoons from at least 1936 until 1963, mainly under the direction of Chuck Jones. First working as an inbetweener, he quickly rose up the ranks to animator. From 1944 to 1945, he worked at UPA for the films Hell-Bent for Election and Brotherhood of Man. He also worked on made-for-television cartoons in the early 1960s. After Jones was fired from Warner Bros., Washam (with other animators working under Jones there) joined him at MGM. Washam also directed a few Tom and Jerry cartoons for release in 1967. He also designed the iconic character Big Boy for the restaurant chain Bob's Big Boy when he was a fry cook there.

From the fall of 1967 Washam taught animation at no charge to eager, young students in weekly classes conducted at his Laurel Canyon home in Los Angeles. He explained that "animation has been good to me and I want to give something back." Many of Ben Washam's students from the late 1970s—which included Ren and Stimpy layout artist Eddie Fitzgerald—would lead the 2D Silver Age animation revival during the 1990s. Washam was known for his ability to explain animation mechanics as pertinent, useful methods,  articulating and communicating the principles.

Washam served two separate terms as cartoonists' union president, including President of the Screen Animators Guild in 1948–49. His last work involved animating television commercials for Jay Ward and drawing layouts at Jones' production company. Washam retired in 1979. In addition to Washam's animation skill, Jones cited him as an able writer. Jones credited Washam with the "thanks for the sour persimmons, cousin" line in Duck Amuck.

Style 
Washam's animation of Bugs Bunny is easy to recognize, as he usually let Bugs' incisor teeth taper to a point. Also, he drew relatively wide cheeks and big pupils on Bugs' eyes. Another Washam trait was his tendency to nod a talking character's head. His work is best recognized by the loose connection of the core body parts, with a great deal of Hip Initiation; this led to multiple assignments of 'personality' scenes, as he could keep interest well in closeup. Chuck Jones commented on his ability to do lovely things with personality animation, although he said that earlier on that his animation was stiff and he tended to work between extremes. His work is angular in pose and fluid in movement.

Honors and awards 
 Annie Award: Winsor McCay Award (1985)

Personal life and final years 
He was married to Jean Washam, who met at Warner Bros. in 1951. They had a son named Trevor, who shoed horses for a living, and he notably shooed the horses of Sylvester Stallone and William Shatner.

Washam died on March 28, 1984, eleven days after his 69th birthday. He is survived by his grandson, also named Ben Washam.
He was cremated.

References

External links 
 

1915 births
1984 deaths
Animators from Arkansas
Warner Bros. Cartoons people